Journal of the Linnean Society is a series of specialised journals published by the Linnean Society of London. They include:

Biological Journal of the Linnean Society
Botanical Journal of the Linnean Society
Zoological Journal of the Linnean Society